Vreshtas is a village and a former municipality in the Korçë County, southeastern Albania. At the 2015 local government reform it became a subdivision of the municipality Maliq. The population at the 2011 census was 7,513. The municipal unit consists of the villages Vreshtas, Sheqeras, Bregas and Podgorie.

References

Former municipalities in Korçë County
Administrative units of Maliq
Villages in Korçë County